Kartell is an Italian company that makes and sells plastic contemporary furniture. It is headquartered in Noviglio, Metropolitan City of Milan, Italy, and it is a subsidiary of Felofin.

History
The company began manufacturing automobile accessories in 1949. It expanded into home furnishings in 1963. It was founded by Giulio Castelli and Anna Castelli Ferrieri. Kartell became well-known due to the work of designer and architect Anna Castelli Ferrieri.

The company opened its first store in the United States in 1998, when a Kartell U.S. outlet opened on Greene Street in New York City. Ivan Luini, president of the U.S. division at that time, oversaw the opening of additional stores in Miami, San Francisco, Atlanta, Boston and Los Angeles.

Kartell's retail marketing strategy is to stock items in various styles and colors at prices that appeal to impulse buyers. The company grosses $100 million per year. In addition to its stores, Kartell furnishings are sold by more than 150 independent retailers in the United States.

At the time of his death, Luini was in discussions for Kartell's plastic furnishings to be used in a hotel chain being designed by Philippe Starck.

The company is a subsidiary of Felofin. Its chairman, chief executive officer and president is Claudio Luti.

Gallery

See also 

 List of Italian companies
 Sergio Savarese

References
 Appelbaum, Alec. (2002, October). Rapt in Plastic. Metropolis
 Graustark, Barbara. (2006, September 18). Ivan Luini, 46, Innovative Design Executive, Dies in Crash. The New York Times, p. A27

External links
Kartell company website

Furniture companies of Italy
Industrial design firms
Design companies of Italy
Companies based in Lombardy
Design companies established in 1949
Manufacturing companies established in 1949
Italian companies established in 1949
Italian brands
Compasso d'Oro Award recipients